Kopačnica is a dispersed settlement in a small valley northwest of Gorenja Vas in  the Municipality of Gorenja Vas–Poljane in the Upper Carniola region of Slovenia.

Geography

Kopačnica consists of scattered farms along the valley of Kopačnica Creek and its tributaries: Podplečica Creek to the northwest, which flows through a canyon in the hamlet of Jezbirc, as well as Podkovščica Creek and Pohovica Creek in the Komajs Gorge to the west, below Stara Oselica. The road to Cerkno passes through the Podplečica Valley, and a road to Leskovica through the Kopačnica Valley to the northeast. Surrounding elevations include Makovc Hill to the east, Mah Hill to the north, Mount Ermanovec to the south, and Vrhovec Hill to the southwest. The village has hayfields and forested land, and some tilled fields in the lower area where the valleys join.

Name
The name Kopačnica is believed to derive from the verb kopati 'to dig' and may be related to the noun kopačina 'field cultivated by digging'. In the past the village was known as Kapatschnitz in German.

History
The Rapallo border between Yugoslavia and Italy passed through the area and the remnants of border guard posts are found nearby. During the Second World War, the Partisans maintained a checkpoint at house number 10 in the village.

References

External links

Kopačnica on Geopedia

Populated places in the Municipality of Gorenja vas-Poljane